Kalle (Karl) Johansson, better known as Eno Kalle or Eno-Kalle Runolinna (1884–1941) was a Finnish poet who lived mainly in the village of Lepsämä in Nurmijärvi, Finland. Eno Kalle wrote songs and broadside ballads which were also published in printed booklets. He also toured himself to present his ballads. A total of 14 ballads were born, covering topics such as love, war, liquor and prohibition, travel and the shipwreck of the SS Kuru in 1929. Even the Simola croft's massacre of Klaukkala in 1899 also ended up being the subject of ballad.

References 
 Fennica Suomen kansallisbibliografia

Notes

External links 
 The broadside ballad collection from the library of the Jyväskylä University: Kalle Juhonpoika, Kalle Johansson
 Photograph of Eno Kalle by Elias Sirenius, circa 1920, from the collections of the Nurmijärvi Museum

1884 births
1941 deaths
People from Nurmijärvi
Finnish male poets
19th-century Finnish poets
20th-century Finnish poets